State of Mind is an American comedy-drama series created by novelist Amy Bloom. The series stars Lili Taylor and premiered on Lifetime on July 15, 2007. Its last episode aired on September 9, 2007.

Synopsis
Taylor as psychiatrist Anne Bellowes, who unexpectedly finds her husband cheating on her with their marriage counselor.  The series deals with Bellowes and her relationship with her patients as well as other doctors in the practice.

Cast
 Lili Taylor as Dr. Ann Bellowes
 Theresa Randle as Dr. Cordelia Banks
 Mido Hamada as Dr. Taj Kalid
 Devon Gummersall as Barry White
 Kevin Chamberlin as Fred Smedresman
 Derek Riddell as Dr. James Lecroix
 Chris Diamantopoulos as Phil Eriksen
 Samira Damavandi as Jhasmine Kalid
 Ken Page as Florian

Episodes

Reception
Common Sense Media gave the show 4 out of 5 stars.

References

External links

2007 American television series debuts
2007 American television series endings
2000s American comedy-drama television series
English-language television shows
Lifetime (TV network) original programming
Television series by Warner Horizon Television
Television shows set in Los Angeles